"I Like" is a song by American singer Keri Hilson. It was written and produced by German musicians David Jost & Robin Grubert and recorded by Hilson for the soundtrack for the German film Zweiohrküken (2009). The track was featured on a re-released edition of Hilson's 2009 studio album In a Perfect World.... It debuted at number 1 on the official German Top 100 Singles chart and was certified Platinum. After its success in Germany, the song entered many other charts in Mainland Europe.

Commercial use
In April 2010, the song was used in a commercial for the broadcasting of US show 90210 on the UK channel E4.

Music video
The music video for "I Like" was shot in October 2009 by Aaron Platt. It premiered online on November 20, 2009, and shows Hilson dancing in front of different scenes, featuring incorporated clips from the Zweiohrküken film. Later, on December 24, 2009, it premiered another version of the video, the main difference was that the video didn't feature incorporated clips from the Zweiohrküken film.

Track listings and formats
German CD single
 "I Like" (Jost  & Grubert radio mix) – 3:37
 "I Like" (Manhattan Clique remix) – 6:01

Australian and UK digital download
 "I Like" (Jost & Grubert radio edit) – 3:37

Charts
On December 21, 2009, Media Control announced that the single had debuted at number 1 on the German Singles Chart. To date, it is her most successful single in Germany, peaking at number 1 for three non-consecutive weeks. It was certified Platinum there, selling over 300,000 copies. The single debuted on the UK Singles Chart at number 68 on May 23, 2010, and peaked at number 34.

Weekly charts

Year-end charts

Certifications

Release history

See also
List of number-one hits of 2009 and 2010 (Germany)

References

2009 singles
Keri Hilson songs
Number-one singles in Germany
Number-one singles in Poland
Songs written by David Jost
Interscope Records singles